156 (one hundred [and] fifty-six) is the natural number, following 155 and preceding 157.

In mathematics

156 is an abundant number, a pronic number, a dodecagonal number, and a refactorable number.

156 is the number of graphs on 6 unlabeled nodes.

156 is a repdigit in base 5 (1111), and also in bases 25, 38, 51, 77, and 155.

156 degrees is the internal angle of a pentadecagon.

In the military
 Convoy HX-156 was the 156th of the numbered series of World War II HX convoys of merchant ships from Halifax, Nova Scotia to Liverpool during World War II
 The Fieseler Fi 156 Storch was a small German liaison aircraft during World War II
 The 
  was a United States Navy T2 tanker during World War II
  was a United States Navy cargo ship during World War II
  was a United States Navy  during World War II
  was a United States Navy ship during World War II
  was a United States Navy  during World War II
  was a United States Navy  during World War II
  was a United States Navy  during World War II
  was a United States Navy  during World War II
  was a United States Navy  during World War II
  was a United States Navy fast civilian yacht during World War I

In music
 156, a song by the Danish rock band Mew appearing in both their 2000 album Half the World Is Watching Me and their 2003 album Frengers.
 NM 156, a 1984 song by the heavy metal band Queensrÿche from the album The Warning
 156, a song by the Polish Black Metal band Blaze of Perdition from the 2010 album Towards the Blaze of Perdition

In transportation
The Alfa Romeo 156 car produced from 1997 to 2006.
The Ferrari 156 was a racecar made by Ferrari from 1961 to 1963.
The Ferrari 156/85 was a Formula One car in the 1985 Formula One season.
The Class 156 "Super Sprinter" DMU train.
The Midland Railway 156 Class, a 2-4-0 tender engine built in the United Kingdom between 1866 and 1874.
London Buses route 156.
Martin 156, known as the Russian clipper, was a large flying boat aircraft intended for transoceanic service.

In other fields
156 is also:
 The year AD 156 or 156 BC
 156 AH is a year in the Islamic calendar that corresponds to 772 – 773 CE
 156 Xanthippe is a main belt asteroid with a dark surface
 The number of hourly gongs a clock strikes in one day (78 AM gongs and 78 PM gongs)
 The number of sons of Magbish in the Census of the men of Israel upon return from exile (Bible, Ezra 2:30)
 United States DS-156 visa issued for U.S. Department of State Nonimmigrant Visa Application
 The atomic number of an element temporarily called Unpenthexium.
 The Indian Head No. 156, Saskatchewan rural municipality in the Canadian province of Saskatchewan

See also
 List of highways numbered 156
 United Nations Security Council Resolution 156
 United States Supreme Court cases, Volume 156
 Pennsylvania House of Representatives, District 156

References

External links

 The Number 156
 156th Street (3rd Avenue El)

Integers